Ipasha Lake is located in Glacier National Park, in the U. S. state of Montana. Melt water from the Ipasha Glacier descends  over Ipasha Falls en route to Ipasha Lake.

See also
List of lakes in Glacier County, Montana

References

Lakes of Glacier National Park (U.S.)
Lakes of Glacier County, Montana